is a 2013 Japanese animated historical fantasy film co-written and directed by Isao Takahata that is an adaptation of The Tale of the Bamboo Cutter, a 10th century Japanese literary tale. It was produced by Studio Ghibli for Nippon Television Network, Dentsu, Hakuhodo DYMP, Walt Disney Japan, Mitsubishi, Toho and KDDI.

Its ensemble voice cast featured Aki Asakura, Kengo Kora, Takeo Chii, Nobuko Miyamoto, Atsuko Takahata, Tomoko Tabata, Tatekawa Shinosuke, Takaya Kamikawa, Hikaru Ijūin, Ryudo Uzaki, Nakamura Shichinosuke II, Isao Hashizume, Yukiji Asaoka (in a special appearance) and Tatsuya Nakadai. It was the final film to feature Chii, who died in June 2012, and also the final film to be directed by Takahata, who died in April 2018.

It was released in Japan on 23 November 2013 by Toho. With a budget of US$49.3 million, it is the most expensive Japanese film to date. It received critical acclaim and was nominated for the Academy Award for Best Animated Feature at the 87th Academy Awards, losing to Big Hero 6. Its production was the subject of the feature-length documentary Isao Takahata and His Tale of the Princess Kaguya.

Plot

A bamboo cutter named Sanuki no Miyatsuko discovers a miniature girl inside a glowing bamboo shoot. Believing her to be a divine presence, he and his wife decide to raise her as their own, calling her "Princess". The girl grows rapidly, earning her the nickname  from the village children. , the oldest among Takenoko's friends, develops a close relationship with her.

Miyatsuko comes upon gold and fine cloth in the bamboo grove the same way he found his daughter. He takes these as proof of her divine royalty and begins planning to make her a proper princess. He relocates the family to the capital, forcing the girl to leave her friends behind, and the family moves into a mansion replete with servants. The girl is saddled with a governess who is tasked with taming her into a noblewoman. The girl struggles with the restraints of nobility, yearning for her prior life in the countryside.

When she comes of age, she is granted the formal name . Miyatsuko holds a celebration, where Kaguya overhears partygoers ridiculing her father's attempts to turn a peasant girl into a noble through money. Kaguya flees the capital in despair and runs back to the mountains, seeking Sutemaru and her friends, but discovers that they have all moved away. She passes out in the snow and awakens back at the party.

Kaguya grows in beauty, attracting suitors. Five noblemen attempt to court her, comparing her to mythical treasures. Kaguya tells them she will only marry whoever can bring her the mythical treasure mentioned. Eventually, spring comes, and the Princess wishes to see the cherry blossoms bloom. Her mother and one of her handmaidens take her back to the country, where not far from the hut she once lived, a tree is in bloom. Reveling in its bursting forth with life, she happily whirls amid its petals, until she accidentally stumbles across a small child. The family of the child quickly takes it away, bowing in her presence, reminding the Princess of who and what she is now.

Returning to the capital, the cart the group is in finds itself stuck, when a ruckus is heard outside. Kaguya notices several men running through the streets, and upon seeing one of them, recognizes Sutemaru. Unable to contain herself, she cries out to him, but upon realizing her station in life, quickly retreats into the carriage as it drives off. Sutemaru attempts to go after her, but is beaten for his attempts, as Kaguya cries.

Two suitors attempt to persuade her with counterfeits, the third abandons his quest, and the fourth gives Kaguya a flower instead of his treasure, but is found by his wife before Kaguya can accept. When the last suitor is killed in his quest, Kaguya becomes depressed. The Emperor takes notice of Kaguya's beauty and tries to kidnap her but she convinces him to leave.

Kaguya reveals to her parents that she originally came from the Moon. Once a resident there, she broke its laws, hoping to be exiled to Earth so that she could experience mortal life. When the Emperor made his advances, she silently begged the Moon to help her. Having heard her prayer, the Moon restored her memories and said she will be reclaimed during the next full moon. Kaguya confesses her attachment to Earth and her reluctance to leave; Miyatsuko swears to protect her and begins turning the mansion into a fortress.

Kaguya returns to her home village and finds Sutemaru. The two profess their love, and in their joy, they fly over the countryside, only to encounter the Moon and fall. Sutemaru wakes up alone and reunites with his wife and child, interpreting the experience as a dream.

On the night of the full moon, a procession of celestial beings led by the Buddha descends from the Moon, and Miyatsuko is unable to stop it. An attendant offers Kaguya a robe that will erase her memories of Earth. She is granted one last moment with her parents before an attendant drapes the robe around her, appearing to erase her memory. They leave, and Miyatsuko and his wife are distraught. Kaguya looks back at Earth one last time, and cries as she remembers her mortal life, which is now only a dream to her.

Voice cast

Production

As a child, Takahata read The Tale of the Bamboo Cutter. He recalled that he struggled to relate and sympathize with the protagonist; to him, the "heroine's transformation was enigmatic" and that it "didn't evoke any empathy from [him]". In 1960, Takahata was preparing for a potential adaptation for his employer Toei Animation, which eventually was abandoned. After rereading the tale, he realized the story's potential to be entertaining, as long as an adaptation allowed the audience to understand how Princess Kaguya felt.

Studio Ghibli revealed that Isao Takahata was working on a feature-length film in 2008. Takahata announced at the 62nd Locarno International Film Festival in 2009 that he intended to direct a film based on the anonymous Japanese literary tale The Tale of the Bamboo Cutter.

The Tale of the Princess Kaguya was financed by Nippon TV, whose late chairman, Seiichiro Ujiie, gave  (approximately ) towards the project. Ujiie loved Takahata's work, and pleaded with Ghibli producer Toshio Suzuki to let Takahata make one more film. Ujiie died on 3 March 2011, but not before being able to view the script and some of the storyboards.

To make sure the audience emotionally connected with the film, it was important to Takahata that viewers were able to "imagine or recall the reality deep within the drawings", rather than be distracted by a realistic art style. He wanted to have people "recollect the realities of this life by sketching ordinary human qualities with simple props". To assist with this vision, Osamu Tanabe provided the character designs and animation, and Kazuo Oga drew the watercolor backgrounds.

The release of The Tale of the Princess Kaguya was finally confirmed by Studio Ghibli and distributor Toho on 13 December 2012.

Themes 

A variety of themes are presented in The Tale of the Princess Kaguya, including feminism and the restriction of women, the beauty of life in spite of sorrow, and the duties and responsibilities of parenting.

Some of the most striking themes introduced are feminism and the restriction of women. Evidence of them is when Princess Kaguya and her adoptive parents moved to the capital city in order to find her a husband befitting her royal status. Such a decision confronted Princess Kaguya's wishes, but her father's urge to make her live a princess' lifestyle prevailed. Moreover, her mother's submissive role in terms of decision-making is evident in the construction of the theme. Another feminist depiction is a dream sequence scene where Princess Kaguya bursts through a series of doors, representing the barriers she faces from her family and society, depicting the many restrictions women face against their own wishes and desires.

Another topic within the film is the illustration of how absurd notions of beauty can be, when she is instructed on the principles of beauty and behaviour of women in the Heian period, principles all royal women must follow. However, the princess expresses her discontent and the pain of having to renounce humanity when expected to stop smiling or expressing any kind of feeling or thought. Moreover, the scene where she sets her suitors impossible tasks shows the fierce determination of a woman in a world dominated by hierarchy and men. Princess Kaguya is independent and introspective, but at times crestfallen and saddened by her living situation.

The weight of immaterial pleasures over wealth is represented mainly through the drawings. The style of soft lines and muted hues express the simplicity of life in rural Japan where Princess Kaguya finds joy around friends and family. In contrast, life in the palace is represented with bolder colors insinuating indulgence. There, Kaguya finds herself full of luxury and wealth, but she is also shown as caged and isolated and in many scenes the film shows how much she misses the simple rural life. This is represented in the scene where Princess Kaguya escapes from the palace searching for freedom, where Takahata uses spontaneous brush strokes abandoning the carefully drawn charcoal lines. The use of heavy and violent strokes when Princess Kaguya runs shows her frustration and despair for having to live in the palace. To add sadness and despair, her eyes start losing their brightness as the film progresses. There is a sense of drowning in her that is constructed when the Princess overheard a group of drunk men talking about wanting to see her and mocking her father for paying to turn her from a commoner into a princess. She takes a breath, the frame pulls back and her image shrinks into the surrounding darkness. This represents her feeling of being constricted and trapped, the self-awareness of her isolation, and surrender to the loss of the happy simple life she once had. Furthermore, both the life of peasants and aristocrats are represented tragically as poverty prevents love, and the restrictions of class prevent Kaguya from enjoying the life she would have chosen for herself.

Beauty in life in spite of pain and suffering is another theme. This is clear in the final scene where the gods come down to earth in order to take Kaguya back to the moon. The gods come on immaculately white clouds, and they are coloured brightly with gentle hues. The joyful music played contrasts the image of the family crying in desperation. Although the deities seem attractive, the dominating mint greens and bold pinks give them an acerbic quality. In contrast, life on Earth is all charcoal. This suggests that life on earth means experiencing loss, grief, sadness and regret. Princess Kaguya, at first, refuses to leave the dark Earth, she states that Earth is full of wonder and beauty. This works as a conclusion as well as a message of hope in humanity.

Another theme present in the movie is the call of adulthood and responsibility. Kaguya was sent from her world to the world of humans, perhaps as a punishment for misbehaviour, thus, she ignores the responsibilities that await her. So when she faces responsibilities on Earth in the palace, she feels upset but eventually realises they are part of her duty. This is in turn stating that everyone in society needs to grow up and live within its restrictions. The theme is also developed with reference to parenting: both parents feel responsible for the princess’ happiness and wellbeing. The moment she arrives they devote themselves to that. Even though her father is blinded by his own understanding of duty for her daughter, he loves her above all and that he never intends to cause her pain. Her mother’s mission, on the other hand, is to accompany her daughter in silence, to listen, to reproduce the home the princess misses so much in the palace's kitchen, where she hides and seeks peace.

Soundtrack

In 2012, Shin-ichiro Ikebe was announced to write the film's score. However, in 2013, Joe Hisaishi replaced Ikebe as the composer. This would be the only time Hisaishi scored a film directed by Isao Takahata. The theme song "When I Remember This Life" was written and performed by Nikaido Kazumi. The music from the film's original soundtrack was released on 20 November 2013.

Release
The Tale of The Princess Kaguya was initially announced to be released simultaneously with The Wind Rises, another Ghibli film by Hayao Miyazaki in Japan in the summer of 2013, which would have marked the first time that the works of the two directors were released together since the release of the films My Neighbor Totoro and Grave of the Fireflies in 1988. However, in February 2013, distributor Toho announced that the release of The Princess Kaguya would be delayed to 23 November 2013, citing concerns that the storyboards were not yet complete. On 12 March 2014, independent distributor GKIDS announced that it had acquired the US rights for the film and that it would release an English dub version produced by Studio Ghibli and Frank Marshall. Chloë Grace Moretz is the voice of the title character in the English dub. It was released in select theaters in North America on 17 October 2014 and was also released on DVD and Blu-ray on 17 February 2015. The film was selected to be screened as part of the Directors' Fortnight section of the 2014 Cannes Film Festival. Its North American première took place at the 2014 Toronto International Film Festival during the festival's "Masters" program.

Reception

Box office
The film debuted at first place during its opening weekend in Japan, grossing . By 2 February 2014, it had grossed ¥2,313,602,733 ($22,613,153) at the Japanese box office. It subsequently grossed  in Japan, where it was the eleventh top-grossing Japanese film of 2014.

Home media 
The Tale of the Princess Kaguya was released in Japan on DVD and Blu-ray by Walt Disney Studios Home Entertainment on 3 December 2014. The Blu-ray sold 13,784 units . The DVD release sold 8,208 units by 7 December 2014 and a further 15,718 units between 8 December 2014 and 7 June 2015, for a combined  DVD units and at least  physical home video units sold in Japan .

In North America, the film was released on DVD, Blu-ray and digital download by Universal Pictures Home Entertainment on 17 February 2015. The DVD and Blu-ray releases grossed  in physical sales, . In the United Kingdom, it was 2015's second best-selling foreign-language film on home video, below Indonesian action film The Raid 2.

Critical reception
Review aggregator Rotten Tomatoes gives the film an approval rating of 100%, with an average rating of 8.21/10, based on 92 reviews. The critics' consensus says, "Boasting narrative depth, frank honesty, and exquisite visual beauty, The Tale of the Princess Kaguya is a modern animated treasure with timeless appeal." It was the first film of the decade to receive an approval rating of 100% on the website, making it one of the highest-rated films of the 2010s. Metacritic, which uses a weighted average, has assigned the film a score of 89 out of 100 based on reviews from 28 critics, indicating "universal acclaim".

In February 2014, The Tale of the Princess Kaguya placed 4th in both Kinema Junpo's Best Ten and their Reader's Choice Awards. David Ehrlich of The A.V. Club gave the film an A, deeming it "the best animated movie of the year," adding that it is "destined to be remembered as one of the revered Studio Ghibli’s finest achievements." Nicolas Rapold of The New York Times praised the artwork calling it "exquisitely drawn with both watercolor delicacy and a brisk sense of line." For IndieWire's 2018 list of the best Japanese films of the 21st century, Carlos Aguilar expressed agreement with the common view that Spirited Away is the greatest, but still chose The Tale of the Princess Kaguya for the list and referred to the latter as "a work of nearly identical caliber […] an artistic triumph that delights with exuberant handcraft where the each pencil stroke comes alive on screen. Takahata made something at once pastoral, timeless, and epic in proportion with an emotional depth rarely seen in films – animated or not."

Accolades

See also
 The Kingdom of Dreams and Madness, a 2013 documentary about the making of the film
 List of films directed by Isao Takahata
 Princess from the Moon, a 1987 major live-action film based on The Tale of the Bamboo Cutter
 List of films with a 100% rating on Rotten Tomatoes

Notes

References

External links
  
  at GKIDS
 
 
 
 
 
 

2010s fantasy drama films
2013 anime films
Anifilm award winners
Animated coming-of-age films
Anime and manga based on fairy tales
Best Animated Feature Film Asia Pacific Screen Award winners
Films about adoption
Fiction about mind control
Films about depression
Films based on Japanese myths and legends
Films directed by Isao Takahata
Films scored by Joe Hisaishi
Films set in feudal Japan
Films set in Japan
Historical fantasy anime and manga
Japanese animated fantasy films
Japanese fantasy drama films
Kaguya-hime
Moon in film
Nippon TV films
Politics in fiction
Studio Ghibli animated films
Toho animated films
Films based on fairy tales